Ronald Richard Etienne (born 18 November 1986 in Grenada) is a West Indian cricketer who has played first-class and List A cricket for the Windward Islands.

References

External links

1986 births
Living people
Grenadian cricketers
Windward Islands cricketers
Grenada representative cricketers
21st-century Grenadian people